Blood of the Tribades is a 2016 horror film directed by Sophia Cacciola and Michael J. Epstein. The script, style, and look are heavily influenced by 1970s Euro lesbian vampire films. The film is distributed in North America on VOD and DVD/Blu-ray by Launch Over and VHS by SRS Media.

Description
Chris Hallock of the Boston Underground Film Festival, where the film had its world premiere on March 27, 2016, calls it, "a love letter to offbeat lesbian vampire films that offers powerful discourse on self-identity, feminism, and the violence wrought from religious dogma".

The film is notable for reversing the typical structure and focus of lesbian vampire films, with ambush bug of Ain't it Cool News noting, "The lesbian vampire is not new in the realm of horror, but whereas in the past, male filmmakers did their best to make lesbianism seem both erotic as well as the outcast other, this film actually makes these vamps sympathetic and shifts gears to change the subject to male oppression versus judgment upon free-spirited feminine wiles".

Starbursts Andrew Marshall examined the film's religious and political allegory in which the words of an ancient religious leader are corrupted over time in order to build favorable power structures: "Through its sex and violence, the film examines the perception of women in an oppressively masculine society, one in which they are taught obedience and complacency, remaining the unwitting victims of theocratic doctrine weaponised by dogmatic fundamentalists. From sapphic symbolism misappropriated by the patriarchal religion to character names representing a disparate assortment of mythologies, the film gradually constructs a culture that could conceivably exist apart from whatever domain may or may not lie beyond the village's borders, while the rampant histrionic misogyny is not only believable within the story's context, but is also rendered all-too plausible by recent real-world developments".

Plot
2000 years after the great vampire Bathor established the village of Bathory, superstition and religious violence take over as the men and women battle for control. When the men are afflicted with a mysterious illness, they become certain that the vampire women of Bathory are responsible for their ills, and thus, the hunt begins! Long-forgotten lovers Élisabeth and Fantine find that, with the help of those who were banished, it is their fate to piece together the past and help preserve what little of their society remains before Bathor's impending return and judgment.

Cast

Production
Funding for the movie was partially raised through a successful Kickstarter campaign.

Critical response
Blood of the Tribades has received generally positive reviews. Kevan Farrow of Scream gave the film 3.5 out of 5 stars, noting, "Blood of the Tribades is both a pretty and fun piece of offbeat melodrama, and an enraged feminist statement". Andrew Marshall of Starburst gave the film 8 out of 10. Daniel XIII of Famous Monsters of Filmland gave 4 out of 5, noting, "All in all this is one hell of a flick: unique, surreal and chock full of the bloody and beautiful goods that lovers of the Euro-horror genre dig like a grave!"

Select festivals and awards
 Boston Underground Film Festival 2016 (Boston, MA) – World Premiere – Winner Best New England Film
 Motor City Nightmares 2016 (Novi, MI)
 Fright Nights Festival of Angst 2016 (Vienna, Austria)
 International Vampire Film and Arts Festival 2016 (Sighisoara, Transylvania, Romania)
 Sanford International Film Festival 2016 (Sanford, ME) –  Winner Best Acting (Ensemble), Nominated for: Best Feature Film, Best Cinematography, Best Screenplay, Best Music
 Fantasmagorical Film Festival 2016 (Louisville, KY) – Winner Best ’70s Throwback, Winner Best Vampire Film
 Gen Con 2016 (Indianapolis, IN)
 GenreBlast Film Festival 2016 (Culpeper, VA) – Winner Best Score (Nominated for: Best Sci-Fi/Fantasy Feature, Best Grindhouse/Exploitation, Best Supporting Actor for Seth Chatfield as Grando, Best Screenplay, Best Poster)
 Starburst International Film Festival 2016 (Manchester, England)
 B Movie Underground and Trash Film Festival 2016 (Breda, The Netherlands)
 Scare-A-Con 2016 (Turning Stone, NY)
 Diabolical Horror Film Festival 2016 – Carnage Awards Nominated Best Feature
 Imaginarium Convention Film Festival 2016 (Louisville, KY) – Winner BEST FEATURE (OVERALL)
 Buffalo Dreams Film Festival 2016 (Williamsville, NY) – Winner BEST RETRO FEATURE  (Nominated: Best Horror Feature, Best Screenwriting)
 Fright Night Film Fest 2016 (Louisville, KY)

References

External links
 

2016 fantasy films
Films shot in Massachusetts
2016 horror films
Films shot in New York (state)
Films shot in Rhode Island
Lesbian-related films
2010s English-language films